Adichunchanagiri University  is a private university located in Javaranahalli, in Mandya district, Karnataka, India.  It was founded and is managed by the Sri Adichunchunagiri Shikshana Trsut ®. The University consists of six Constituent colleges in the disciplines of Medicine, Pharmacy, Nursing, Engineering, Management, Commerce and Education. Constituent institutions under the university are Adichunchanagiri Institute of Medical Sciences(AIMS), BGS institute of technology(BGSIT), Sri Adichunchanagiri College of Pharmacy(SACCP), Adichunchanagiri college of nursing(ACN), BGS first grade college(BGSFGC) and BGS College of Education(BGSCE).

Constituent College's 
1. Adichunchunagiri Institute of Medical Science's

2. BGS Institute of technology

3. Adichunchunagiri college of Nursing

4. Sri Adichunchunagiri college of Pharmacy

5. BGS First Grade college

6. BGS College of Education

References

External links 
 

Private universities in India
2018 establishments in Karnataka
Educational institutions established in 2018